Clive Solomons Stadium is a multi-use stadium in Bloemfontein, Free State, South Africa.  It is currently used mostly for football matches and is the home ground of Bubchu United.

Sports venues in the Free State (province)
Soccer venues in South Africa